Kochaniyathi is a 1971 Indian Malayalam film, directed and produced by P. Subramaniam. The film stars Madhu, Jayabharathi, Vincent and Ramachandran in the lead roles. The film had musical score by Pukazhenthi.

Cast

Madhu as Raju
Jayabharathi as Indu
Vincent as Doctor Mohan
Ramachandran
T. R. Omana as Raju's Mother
Alummoodan as Cook
Annamma
Aranmula Ponnamma as Doctor's Mother
Baby Sumathi as Indu (childhood)
KPAC Sunny as Raghu
Master Prabhakar as Raju (childhood)
Pankajavalli as Kunchu Nair's Wife
Paravoor Bharathan as Rowdy Soman
S. P. Pillai as Kunchu Nair
K. V. Shanthi as Karthyayini
Sarasamma
Somasekharan Nair

Soundtrack
The music was composed by Pukazhenthi and the lyrics were written by Sreekumaran Thampi.

References

External links
 

1971 films
1970s Malayalam-language films
Films scored by Pukazhenthi